Palu District is a district of Elazığ Province of Turkey. Its seat is the town Palu. Its area is 730 km2, and its population is 18,648 (2021).

Composition
There are 2 municipalities in Palu District:
Beyhan
Palu

There are 37 villages in Palu District:

 Akbulut
 Akyürek
 Altınölçek
 Andılar
 Arındık
 Atik
 Baltaşı
 Beydoğan
 Bozçanak
 Bölükelma
 Burgudere
 Büyükçaltı
 Damlapınar
 Gemtepe
 Gökdere
 Güllüce
 Gümeçbağlar
 Gümüşkaynak
 Hasbey
 Karacabağ
 Karasalkım
 Karataş
 Kasıl
 Kayahisar
 Kayaönü
 Keklikdere
 Kırkbulak
 Köklüce
 Küçükçaltı
 Örencik
 Örgülü
 Seydili
 Tarhana
 Umutkaya
 Üçdeğirmenler
 Yarımtepe
 Yeşilbayır

References

Districts of Elazığ Province